...And Seven Nights is an album by the blues musician John Lee Hooker. It was recorded in London in 1964 and released by the Verve Folkways label the following year. Hooker plays with the British band the Groundhogs. The album was re-released with the title Hooker and the Hogs and with overdubbed horns as On the Waterfront.

Reception

AllMusics reviewer, Bruce Eder, wrote, "The sound is raw, tight, and raunchy, some of the best band-backed recordings of Hooker's career. He's notoriously difficult to play support for because of the spontaneity of his work, but these guys keep up and then some, adding engaging flourishes and grace notes. Hooker is in excellent voice, and his material is as strong as any album in his output, rough, dark, and moody."

Track listing
All compositions credited to John Lee Hooker
 "Bad Luck and Trouble" – 4:05
 "Waterfront" – 4:20
 "No One Pleases Me But You" – 2:20
 "It's Raining Here" – 3:55
 "It's a Crazy Mixed Up World" – 4:10
 "Seven Days And Seven Nights" – 3:55
 "Mai Lee" – 3:36
 "I'm Losin' You" – 3:50
 "Little Girl Go Back to School" – 3:55
 "Little Dreamer" – 4:10
 "Don't Be Messin' with My Bread" – 3:24

Personnel
John Lee Hooker – guitar, vocals
Tom Parker – piano, organ
Tony McPhee – guitar
Pete Cruickshank – electric bass
Dave Boorman – drums

References

John Lee Hooker albums
1965 albums
Verve Forecast Records albums